Shum Wan Shan is a peak in Kwun Tong, Hong Kong. There is a water pumping station on Shum Wan Shan.

Name
Some older maps do not show the name of this hill. The name of this mountain is sometimes misspelled as "Shun Wan Shan" instead of "Shum Wan Shan".

See also
 List of mountains, peaks and hills in Hong Kong

References